Griveaudia discothyrata is a moth in the  family Callidulidae. It was described by Gustave Poujade in 1895. It is found in western China.

References

Natural History Museum Lepidoptera generic names catalog

Callidulidae
Moths described in 1895